George Bratley (17 January 1909 – March 1978) was an English footballer.

Bratley was a central defender who signed for Rotherham United in 1929, before briefly moving to Sheffield Wednesday before returning to Rotherham in 1934. He had a spell in non-League football with Gainsborough Trinity from 1934 to 1935 and Bath City from 1935 to 1936 before moving back to the Football League in 1936 with Barrow. He moved in 1938 to Swindon Town, before returning to non-League in 1939 with Tunbridge Wells Rangers.

References

1909 births
1978 deaths
English footballers
Association football defenders
Rotherham United F.C. players
Sheffield Wednesday F.C. players
Gainsborough Trinity F.C. players
Bath City F.C. players
Barrow A.F.C. players
Swindon Town F.C. players
Tunbridge Wells F.C. players
English Football League players